Wigberto "Ka Bobby" Ebarle Tañada Sr. (born August 13, 1934) is a Filipino politician. He is member of the Liberal Party and a former member of the Senate of the Philippines (1987–1995) and Philippine House of Representatives representing the Quezon's 4th District (1995–2001). He is the son of the late former senator Lorenzo M. Tañada, known as "grand old man of the Philippine politics".

Early life and career

Tañada studied at Quezon Elementary School from 1942 to 1944. In 1944, he transferred to Gumaca Central School. The next year he moved to St. John's Academy. He finished his elementary and secondary education at Ateneo de Manila University in 1948. He received his Bachelor of Arts at Ateneo de Manila University in 1952. In 1956, he received his Bachelor of Laws degree at Manuel L. Quezon University and passed the bar exams four years later. He received his Master of Laws degree at Harvard Law School. His father taught him to save on money during his studies, while sending "balikbayan" (back home) gifts of San Miguel Beer to his dormitory.

Political life
On March 7, 1986, Tañada was appointed Commissioner of the Bureau of Customs. He ran for senator under the banner of LABAN (Coalition of the Liberal Party, PDP-Laban, NUCD, Bansang Nagkakaisa sa Diwa at Layunin (BANDILA), etc.) and won. In the same year, he became a member of Judicial Bar Council. In 1991, he led the "Magnificent 12", the group of the senators who support the rejection of a new lease for the Subic Bay Naval Base. The next year in 1992, he ran again for senator under the banner of Liberal Party-PDP-Laban Alliance, and he was elected for a three-year term, the last remaining Liberal candidate that won in this election. In 1993, he became the president of the Liberal Party. After his tenure as a senator on 1995, he was elected as a member of the Philippine House of Representatives representing the Quezon's 4th District. He was re-elected on 1998. In 2001, he ran again for senator under the banner of Liberal Party (People Power Coalition) but did not win. 
Recipient of the 1999 TOFIL Award for government and public service.

See also
Lorenzo M. Tañada
Lorenzo "Erin" Tañada III
Gumaca, Quezon

References

Further reading
Philippine House of Representatives Congressional Library

External links

|-

1934 births
Living people
Liberal Party (Philippines) politicians
Ateneo de Manila University alumni
Harvard Law School alumni
People from Quezon
20th-century Filipino lawyers
Minority leaders of the Senate of the Philippines
Senators of the 9th Congress of the Philippines
Senators of the 8th Congress of the Philippines
Manuel L. Quezon University alumni
Members of the House of Representatives of the Philippines from Quezon
Commissioners of the Bureau of Customs of the Philippines
Wigberto
Presidents of the Liberal Party of the Philippines